, operating under the brand name FE, is a Japanese electrical equipment company, manufacturing pressure transmitters, flowmeters, gas analyzers, controllers, inverters, pumps, generators, ICs, motors, and power equipment.

History
Fuji Electric was established in 1923 as a capital and technology tie-up between Furukawa Electric, a spinoff from Furukawa zaibatsu company, and Siemens AG. The name “Fuji” is derived from Furukawa's “Fu” and Siemens' “Ji”, since German pronunciation of Siemens is written jiimensu in Japanese romanization. The characters used to write Mount Fuji were used as ateji.

In 1935, Fuji Electric spun off the telephone department as Fuji Tsushinki (lit. Fuji Communications Equipment, now Fujitsu).

Divisions and products
Power and social infrastructure
Nuclear power-related equipment
Solar power generation systems
Fuel cells
Energy management systems
Smart meters
Industrial infrastructure
Transmission and distribution equipment — joint venture with Schneider Electric
Industrial power supply equipment
Industrial drive systems
Heating and induction furnace equipment
Plant control and measurement systems
Radiation monitoring systems
Power electronics
Inverters/servo systems
Transportation power electronics
Uninterruptible power supply systems
Power conditioners
Power distribution and control equipment
Electronic devices
Power semiconductors
Photoconductive drums
Magnetic disks
Food and beverage distribution
Vending machines
Retail distribution systems
Currency handling equipment
Freezing and refrigerated showcases

Source

References

External links

Fuji Electric Group  
List of Fuji Electric Systems Distributors 
  Wiki collection of bibliographic works on Fuji Electric

Electronics companies of Japan
Electrical equipment manufacturers
Electrical engineering companies of Japan
Electrical wiring and construction supplies manufacturers
Heating, ventilation, and air conditioning companies
Vending machine manufacturers
Manufacturing companies based in Tokyo
Companies listed on the Tokyo Stock Exchange
Electronics companies established in 1923
Japanese companies established in 1923
Japanese brands
Furukawa Group
Pump manufacturers
Electric motor manufacturers